QuickBooks is an accounting software package developed and marketed by Intuit. First introduced in 1983, QuickBooks products are geared mainly toward small and medium-sized businesses and offer on-premises accounting applications as well as cloud-based versions that accept business payments, manage and pay bills, and payroll functions.

History
Intuit was founded in 1983 by Scott Cook and Tom Proulx in Mountain View, California, USA. After the success of its Quicken product for individual financial management, the company developed similar services for small business owners.

Initial release
The initial Quicken software did not function as a "double-entry" accounting package. The initial release of QuickBooks was the DOS version that was based on the Quicken codebase.  The Windows and Mac versions shared a different codebase that was based on In-House Accountant, which Intuit had acquired. The software was popular among small business owners who had no formal accounting training. As such, the software soon claimed up to 85 percent of the US small business accounting software market. It continued to command the vast majority of this market as of 2013. Professional accountants, however, were not satisfied with early versions of the system, citing poor security controls, such as no audit trail, as well as non-conformity with traditional accounting standards.

Subsequent releases
Intuit sought to bridge the gap with these accounting professionals, eventually providing full audit trail capabilities, double-entry accounting functions and increased functions. By 2000, Intuit had developed Basic and Pro versions of the software and, in 2003, started offering industry-specific versions, with workflow processes and reports designed for each of these business types along with terminology associated with the trades.

Options now include versions for manufacturers, wholesalers, professional service firms, contractors, non-profit entities and retailers, in addition to one specifically designed for professional accounting firms who service multiple small business clients. In May 2002 Intuit launched QuickBooks Enterprise Solutions for medium-sized businesses.

In September 2005, QuickBooks had 74% of the market in the US. A June 19, 2008 Intuit Press Release said that as of March 2008, QuickBooks' share of retail units in the business accounting category reached 94.2 percent, according to NPD Group. It also says that more than 50,000 accountants, CPAs and independent business consultants are members of the QuickBooks ProAdvisor program. By then Brad Smith was the new CEO, though former CEO Steve Bennett had nearly tripled Intuit revenue and quadrupled earnings in eight years.

On September 22, 2014, Intuit announced the release of QuickBooks 2015 with features that users have been requesting from the past versions. The release includes improved income tracker, pinned notes, improved registration process and insights on homepage.

In September 2015, Intuit released QuickBooks 2016 that contains several improvements to the existing ones and new features such as batch transaction, bill tracking, continuous feed label printer support, batch delete/void transactions etc.

In September 2016, Intuit released QuickBooks 2017 with several improvements like automated reports, smart search and improved viewing of report filters among other things.

In 2017, Intuit released QuickBooks 2018, adding features such as mobile inventory barcode scanning, multi-monitor support, search in the chart of accounts, etc.

On September 17, 2018, Intuit announced the release of QuickBooks 2019 with some unique features requested by its users, including a history tracker for customer invoices, the ability to transfer credits between other jobs of the same customer, payroll adjustment feature, and more. 

On September 16, 2019, QuickBooks 2020 was launched with the aim to improve the reliability and experience of using the software. All the desktop versions - Pro, Premier, Accountant, and Enterprise  - include new features like the ability to add customer PO numbers in email subject lines, send batch invoices to customers, automatic payment reminders, collapse and expand columns, easy QuickBooks version update etc.

On September 4, 2020, Intuit rolled out QuickBooks 2021 with improved payment process and automated features. All the desktop editions in this version have streamlined bank feeds, automated receipt management, rule-based customer groups, payment reminders, customized payment receipts, data level permissions, and batch delete sales orders.

International versions
Versions of this product are available in many different markets. Intuit's Canadian, British and Australian divisions offer versions of QuickBooks that support the unique tax calculation needs of each region, such as Canada's GST, HST or PST sales tax, VAT for the United Kingdom edition and Australia's GST sales tax. The QuickBooks UK edition also includes support for Irish and South African VAT.  
QuickBooks Enterprise was withdrawn from the UKI market in 2014.

QuickBooks Desktop is only available on a rental/subscription basis for users in UK and Ireland, and is to be withdrawn from sale with no desktop software replacement with the final version being the 2021 edition.

The Mac (macOS) version is available only in the United States.

Quickbooks announced that their products and service offerings for accountancy and small business customers will no longer be available in India after 31 January 2023.

Features
Intuit has integrated several web-based features into QuickBooks, including remote access capabilities, remote payroll assistance and outsourcing, electronic payment functions, online banking and reconciliation, mapping features through integration with Google Maps, marketing options through Google, and improved e-mail functionality through Microsoft Outlook and Outlook Express. For the 2008 version, the company has also added import from Excel spreadsheets, additional employee time tracking options, pre-authorization of electronic funds and new Help functions. In June 2007, Intuit announced that QuickBooks Enterprise Solutions would run on Linux servers, whereas previously it required a Windows server to run.

QuickBooks Online
Intuit also offers a cloud service called QuickBooks Online (QBO). The user pays a monthly subscription fee rather than an upfront fee and accesses the software exclusively through a secure logon via a Web browser. Intuit provides patches, and regularly upgrades the software automatically, but also includes pop-up ads within the application for additional paid services.

, QuickBooks Online had the most subscribers for an online accounting platform, with 624,000 subscribers. compared to Xero, which reported 284,000 customers as of July 2014.

The cloud version is a distinct product from the desktop version of QuickBooks, and has many features that work differently than they do in desktop versions.

In 2013, Intuit announced that it had rebuilt QuickBooks Online "from the ground up" with a platform that allows third parties to create small business applications and gives customers the ability to customize the online version of QuickBooks.

QuickBooks Online is supported on Chrome, Firefox, Internet Explorer 10, Safari 6.1, and also accessible via Chrome on Android and Safari on iOS 7. One may also access QuickBooks Online via an iPhone, a BlackBerry, and an Android web app.
 
In 2011, Intuit introduced a UK-specific version of QuickBooks Online to address the specific VAT and European tax system. There are also versions customized for the Canadian, Indian, and Australian markets, as well as a global version that can be customized by the user.

Quickbooks Online offers integration with other third-party software and financial services, such as banks, payroll companies, and expense management software.

QuickBooks desktop also supports a migration feature where customers can migrate their desktop data from a pro or prem SKU's to Quickbooks Online.

QuickBooks Point of Sale
QuickBooks Point of Sale is software that replaces a retailer's cash register, tracks its inventory, sales, and customer information, and provides reports for managing its business and serving its customers.

Add-on programs 
Through the Solutions Marketplace, Intuit encouraged third-party software developers to create programs that fill niche areas for specific industries and integrate with QuickBooks. Intuit partnered with Lighter Capital to create a $15 million fund for developers designing apps for Intuit Quickbooks. The Intuit Developer Network provides marketing and technical resources, including software development kits (SDKs).

Intuit's Lacerte and ProConnect Tax Online tax preparation software for professional accountants who prepare tax returns for a living integrates with QuickBooks in this way. Microsoft Office also integrates with QuickBooks.

Criticism

As of November 2014, users of QuickBooks for OSX had reported compatibility issues with Apple's new operating system, OS X Yosemite.

See also

Comparison of accounting software

References

External links
 

Accounting software
Intuit software